Sugasawa (written: 菅澤) is a Japanese surname. Notable people with the surname include:

, Japanese basketball player
, Japanese women's footballer

Japanese-language surnames